Al Ghuraba training camp (Arabic الغرباء) is an alleged al Qaeda training camp in Afghanistan, near Kabul.

Alleged alumni

References

Al-Qaeda facilities